Lyublino may refer to:
Lyublino District in Moscow, Russia
Lyublino (Moscow Metro), a station of the Moscow Metro, Moscow, Russia
Lyublino, Kaliningrad Oblast, a settlement in Kaliningrad Oblast, Russia
Lyublino, name of several other rural localities in Russia